Paul Chase may refer to:

Paul Chase (educator), dean of the University of Wisconsin
Paul Chase (soccer) (born 1981), U.S. soccer defender
Paul A. Chase (1895–1963), Associate Justice of the Vermont Supreme Court
Paul Ashley Chase (1878–1946), founding executive of Warner Brothers Pictures